The 2022–23 Iran Super League season is the 33rd season of the Iranian basketball league.

Regular season

First Round

Second round

Group A

Group B

Group C

Standings

Playoffs

Quarterfinals 

|}

Semifinals 

|}

Final 

|}

References

 Asia Basket
 Iranian Basketball Federation

Iranian Basketball Super League seasons
Iran